John J. Wildberg (September 4, 1902 – February 8, 1959) was an American copyright attorney, who later became a theatre producer.

He was born Jacques Wildberg in New York, NY, the eldest son of Jacob and Joan Wildberg.

Wildberg's most successful show; Anna Lucasta was produced in 1944. Together with Cheryl Crawford, he co-produced the first revival of Porgy and Bess (1942) and One Touch of Venus (1943).

Wildberg's fourth marriage (her third), to novelist Ursula Parrott in 1934, ended in June 1938 on the grounds of his intolerable cruelty.

In 1950 his fifth wife took an overdose of sedatives and died in bed next to him. Wildberg had various business ventures in London, England, and eventually moved there in 1951. He died there on February 8, 1959, and was cremated in Golders Green Crematorium.

Selected productions
 A Woman's a Fool - to Be Clever, October 18, 1938 - October 1938
 Porgy and Bess, January 22, 1942 - September 26, 1942 (co-producer)
 Porgy and Bess, September 13, 1943 - October 2, 1943 (associate producer)
 One Touch of Venus, October 7, 1943 - February 10, 1945 (co-producer)
 Porgy and Bess, February 7, 1944 - April 8, 1944
 Anna Lucasta (all-black cast), August 30, 1944 - November 30, 1946
 Memphis Bound, May 24, 1945 - June 23, 1945
 Anna Lucasta, September 22, 1947 - October 18, 1947
 Black Chiffon, September 27, 1950 - January 13, 1951

References

External links
 
 

1902 births
1959 deaths
American theatre managers and producers
Lawyers from New York City
20th-century American lawyers
20th-century American businesspeople